— From Sir John Harington, A New Discourse of a Stale Subject, called the Metamorphosis of Ajax

Nationality words link to articles with information on the nation's poetry or literature (for instance, Irish or France).

Events

Works published in English
 Anonymous, King Edward the Fourth and the Tanner of Tamworth, a ballad
 Thomas Campion, Poemata
 Thomas Churchyard, A Pleasant Discourse of Court and Wars
 Henoch Clapham, 
 Peter Colse, Penelopes Complaint; or, A Mirrour for Wanton Minions
 Anthony Copley, A Fig for Fortune
 Roger Cotton:
 
 
 Sir John Davies, published anonymously, 
 John Dickenson, The Shepheardes Complaint
 Michael Drayton:
 Mortimeriados, a long poem on the Wars of the Roses, in ottava rima (revised as The Barrons Wars 1603)
 
 Bartholomew Griffin, Fidessa, a sequence of sonnets
 Sir John Harington, a satire for which Harrington was banished from the English court
 Gervase Markham, 
 Christopher Middleton, The Historie of Heaven
 William Smith, 
 Edmund Spenser:
 
 Fowre Hymnes, published with the second edition of Daphnaida 1591
 
 The Second Part of the Faerie Queene: Containing the fourth, fifth and sixth books (books 1–3 first published in 1590; see also Faerie Queene 1609)
 William Warner, fourth edition (12 books); see also  1586, second edition 1589, third edition 1592, fifth edition 1602,  1606

Works published in other languages
 Francisco Rodrigues Lobo, Romances
 Alonso Pinciano, Filosofía antigua poética  ("Antique Poetic Philosophy"), Spanish criticism

Births
 September 4 – Constantijn Huygens (died 1687), Dutch poet and composer
 September – James Shirley (died 1666), English poet and playwright
 Xiao Yuncong (died 1673), Chinese landscape painter, calligrapher, and poet

Deaths
 October 3 – Florent Chrestien (born 1540), French satirist and Latin poet
 Bargeo (born 1517), Italian, Latin-language poet
 Georg List (born 1532), German
 Henry Willobie (born 1575), English
 Ou Daren (born 1516), Ming dynasty poet and scholar

See also

 Poetry
 16th century in poetry
 16th century in literature
 Dutch Renaissance and Golden Age literature
 Elizabethan literature
 English Madrigal School
 French Renaissance literature
 Renaissance literature
 Spanish Renaissance literature
 University Wits

Notes

16th-century poetry
Poetry